Range Law may refer to:
 Range Law (1931 film), an American pre-Code Western film
 Range Law (1944 film), an American Western film